Uncovered may refer to:
 Uncovered (John Farnham album), 1980
 Uncovered (Shawn Colvin album), 2015
 Uncovered (Steve Harley album), 2020
 Uncovered (film), 1994
 Uncovered: The War on Iraq, a 2004 documentary film
 Uncovered (magazine), a UK magazine dealing with mental health and Wellness issues
 Uncovered (short story collection), a book by Australian author Paul Jennings
 Uncovered (TV series), a television series broadcast on Sky One, 1997–2002
 "Uncovered", a song by Soundgarden from Louder Than Love

See also
 Uncover (disambiguation)
 Cover (disambiguation)